OKO (obsolete Russian word for eye, also an abbreviation for Ob'yedinonnyye Kristallom Osnovaniya (literal meaning Foundations Bound by a Crystal)) is a complex of two skyscrapers located on plot 16 in the Moscow International Business Center (MIBC) in Moscow, Russia.

The two skyscrapers, North Tower and South Tower, are among the tallest skyscrapers in Russia, with the latter being the taller of the two. Rising , the 85-story South Tower, also known as the OKO Apartment Tower or 16a IBC Tower 1, was the tallest building in Russia and Europe when constructed, until it was surpassed by Federation Tower a few months later.

History 

Construction of the OKO complex started in 2011.

In the summer of 2014, the South Tower of the OKO complex surpassed the height of the neighboring Mercury City Tower (also in the MIBC) as the tallest building in Russia and Europe, only to be surpassed by the neighboring Vostok/East Tower of the Federation Towers (also in the MIBC) in November 2014, only a few months later. It was also during this period the OKO was the tallest building made of reinforced concrete.

On 28 November 2015, the OKO complex was completed and put into operation.

On 27 July 2016, the Government of Moscow purchased from the owner of OKO, Capital Group, 55,000 m² of space in one of the towers of the OKO complex at a cost estimated at 14.3 billion rubles.

Design

Overview 
The facades of the complex are connected with diagonal folds and are linked by a faceted base, giving a noticeable shard effect that defines the towers' appearance. In addition, the towers' canted folds allow each other to recede from one another as they rise. The complex forms an L-shaped composition at the ground plane that is pulled to perimeter of the site. This placement and the facade folds both allow the building to lean over the nearby Third Ring Road. A landscaped plaza sits at the base of the buildings and creates a sheltered, private garden that guides occupants to separate lobbies, in addition to give public space to pedestrians to rest. The building’s all-glass facade offers several features that benefit its occupants. Ventilated mullions can be opened manually to allow natural air flow into the interior. These mullions also help to mitigate stack effect. These features also allow the complex to give out a dynamic and shifting exterior.

In addition, the 28th and 49th floors of the North Tower and the 7th, 27th, 46th, 65th and 83rd floors of the South Tower have entresol, so it can be counted 51 and 90 floors in those buildings accordingly.

Features 
The South Tower is used as a residential building and a hotel. The North Tower is used as an office. The complex also has a restaurant and a fitness center.

Construction gallery

See also
 OKO Tower
 Mercury City Tower
 Imperia Tower
 Eurasia (building)
 List of tallest buildings in Russia

References

External links

 

Moscow International Business Center
Residential skyscrapers in Moscow